Richard Stern may refer to:

Richard Martin Stern (1915–2001), American novelist
Richard G. Stern (1928–2013), American writer and educator in the field of literature
Richard H. Stern (born 1931), American lawyer, writer, academic in the field of intellectual property
Richard J. Stern (1913-2001), American financier and philanthropist 
Richard Stern, British former Vice-President of the World Bank; brother of Nicholas Stern, Baron Stern of Brentford
Richard Stern, CEO of TuneIn, Inc.

See also 
Richard Sterne (disambiguation)
Richard Stearns (disambiguation)